Paranerita is a genus of moths in the family Erebidae erected by George Hampson in 1901.

Species

Paranerita basirubra Reich, 1935
Paranerita bione E. D. Jones, 1914
Paranerita carminata Schaus, 1905
Paranerita coccineothorax Rothschild, 1922
Paranerita columbiana Gaede, 1928
Paranerita cuneoplagiatus Rothschild, 1922
Paranerita diversa Rothschild, 1917
Paranerita flexuosa Schaus, 1911
Paranerita granatina (Rothschild, 1909)
Paranerita grandis (Rothschild, 1909)
Paranerita hyalinata (Reich, 1933)
Paranerita inequalis (Rothschild, 1909)
Paranerita irma Schaus, 1920
Paranerita irregularis Rothschild, 1909
Paranerita kennedyi Rothschild, 1917
Paranerita metapyrioides Rothschild, 1916
Paranerita metaxantha Dognin, 1914
Paranerita niobe Schaus, 1911
Paranerita orbifer Hampson, 1916
Paranerita oroyana Rothschild, 1922
Paranerita patara (Druce, 1896)
Paranerita peninsulata Dognin, 1914
Paranerita persimilis (Rothschild, 1909)
Paranerita peruviana Rothschild, 1909
Paranerita polyxena (Druce, 1883)
Paranerita polyxenoides Rothschild, 1909
Paranerita rosacea (Rothschild, 1909)
Paranerita rubidata Gaede, 1928
Paranerita translucida Rothschild, 1917
Paranerita triangularis (Rothschild, 1909)

Former species
Paranerita haemabasis Dognin, 1914

References

 
Phaegopterina
Moth genera